Wuling Hongguang Plus is a compact Multi-Purpose Vehicle (MPV) produced since September 2019 by SAIC-GM-Wuling.

Overview

Despite the Wuling Wuling Hongguang name, the Wuling Hongguang Plus is positioned to be more upmarket and was based on the new CN150 modular platform and was given a different styling featuring a new exterior and interior.

The Wuling Hongguang Plus also gains a new 1.5 litre turbocharged engine and a brand new 6 speed manual gearbox.

References

External links

 Wuling Hongguang Plus website (China)
 Images of Wuling Hongguang Plus collected by Google Search

Hongguang Plus
Rear-wheel-drive vehicles
Compact MPVs
Cars introduced in 2019
2010s cars
Cars of China